Employment Ice Age (or Lost Generation) is a term in Japan that refers to people who became accustomed to unstable and temporary employment beginning in the 1990s and until at least 2010. This period has particularly affected Gen X (people in their 40s and 50s in 2020) and impacted their financial well-being, health, outlook, and ability to start families.

Given Japan's aging population, there is concern that government focus on the elderly has overshadowed those too poor to have ever started a family, who themselves will be moving into old age largely devoid of the financial resources other generations had. Government efforts on this matter have been deemed far too little and too late, and Nikkei writers claim that lawmakers remain unaware of the gravity of the situation.

Economic impact
Japan's asset price bubble collapse in 1991 led to a period of economic stagnation known as the "Lost Decade", sometimes extended as the "Lost 20 Years" or greater. From 1995 to 2007, the GDP of Japan fell from $5.33 trillion to $4.36 trillion in nominal terms. From the early 2000s, the Bank of Japan set out to encourage economic growth through a novel policy of quantitative easing. Debt levels continued to rise in response to the global financial crisis in 2007, the Tōhoku earthquake and tsunami and Fukushima nuclear disaster in 2011, and the COVID-19 pandemic from 2020. As of 2021, Japan has significantly higher levels of public debt than any other developed nation, at approximately 260% of GDP.

Before
The Japanese economy is a highly developed free-market economy. It is the world's second-largest developed economy. It is the third-largest in the world by nominal GDP and the fourth-largest by purchasing power parity (PPP). Japan is a member of both the G7 and G20.

From the mid-1970s to 1985, after the 1973 Oil Crisis, the ratio of new jobs in the Japanese labor market to applicants was between 0.9 and 1, remaining under 1.0 through 1987. However, the ratio of active job openings to applicants was between 0.6 and 0.7.

During
Due to the Plaza Accord in September 1985 and a cultural appreciation of the yen, the Japanese economy became a bubble economy, led by domestic demand, with a low-interest rate policy. Native Japanese companies reached record highs in their stock prices, which led to excessive capital and profit. In 1989, the Tokyo Stock Exchange reached another high index of USD$40,000 due to the Japanese economy's profits.

The employment ratio of "new jobs to job offers given to applicants" went up by 3 points, to 1.43 in 1991.

After
The Bank of Japan, in an effort to combat the economic stagnation in 1989, sharply raised inter-bank lending rates. This caused the figurative "pop" of the Japanese economic bubble, starting the new decade off with a recession not seen since the post-war period. This caused the fall of equity and asset prices, which led to overly-leveraged Japanese banks and insurance companies with books full of bad debt. The financial institutions were bailed out through capital infusions from the government, loans and cheap credit from the central bank, and the ability to postpone the recognition of losses, ultimately turning them into zombie banks.

These banks injected the funds they got from bailouts into what would be zombie funds, saying the funds were too big to fail. This later became one of the reasons for Japanese economic stagnation in the 1990s, and the reduction of national banks in Japan to just four. However, since the banks could only survive with government bailouts, these funds failed anyway, and so did the banks in the 2000s.

The ratio of "new jobs to job offers given to applicants" reached its lowest level at 0.45 in 2009, but climbed to a record high at 1.62 in 2018. As of July 2022, it was 1.25.

Social impact
This failing economy kicked off what would be called the Japanese Lost Generation; in the 1990s, this consisted of college graduates who were unable to find employment and thus suffered the economic consequences. In subsequent decades, they were only able to find low-paying, part-time jobs due to the extreme influence of the popping of the economic bubble. By 2020, these same graduates were middle-aged.

The Lost Generation presents the “8050 Problem”, which described a situation where middle-aged, reclusive, and unemployed Japanese still dependent on their elderly parents for housing and financial assistance. The group is defined loosely as those aged 35 to 44 who left school between the mid-1990s and mid-2000s, were unable to get permanent jobs, and ended up flitting from one low-wage, dead-end part-time job to another. Japan has an estimated 613,000 middle-aged , a term usually used to describe socially withdrawn adolescents who hole up in their bedrooms, according to the results of a government survey released in March 2019, these shut-ins deserve acceptance and a place within society.Japanese employers are accustomed to hiring fresh graduates whom they can train and mould from scratch. However, this preference makes it more difficult for older or less-educated workers to re-enter the job market and find stable employment, and thus prolongs any initial loss of employment opportunities. One potential key reason why the Lost Generation in particular prompted a wider recognition of this "youth employment problem" was the generation's relatively large population size, as Japanese society was unable to withstand its considerable quantitative impact.

Violence
Many of Japan's recent violent crimes may have been caused by social unrest created by the Employment Ice Age. For instance, Michinao Kono—the knife-yielding man who killed two and injuring 19 in May 2019—was an out-of-work 45-year-old who had never left his parent's home. The "Joker attack" on 1 November 2021 was committed by Kyoto Hotori, an unemployed man who was discontented with society at large. Former Prime Minister Shinzo Abe's assassin, Tetsuya Yamagami, was a former member of Japan's self-defence-force who had difficulties finding a full-time job.

Support
Since Japan’s postwar period, the Employment Ice Age was the first to reveal the necessity for young people to receive support from society.

On 1 January 2020, amid chronic labour shortages in the country's tightest job market, the Japanese government appealed among employers for a major exemplar shift to hire 3 million “Employment Ice Age Generation” workers as full-time employees. At the time, this group constituted 21.2 million "irregular" workers (37.9% of Japan's workforce), for whom the Japanese Government pledged to spend ¥65 billion (USD$962 million) over the next three years.

Low birthrate
Japan's birthrate is among the lowest in world. In 2020, the expected number of births per woman in Japan declined to 1.34. A major cause of the declining number of births is the fact that women are delaying marriage. According to the Health Ministry, the number of registered marriages fell 12.3% in 2020, to 525,490. Since Japanese women traditionally expect men to be providers, men who do not make enough to support a family either cannot find partners or feel so underconfident that they do not bother. The result is the Japanese phenomenon called  ("grass-eaters" or "herbivore men"), referring to 75% of Japanese males in their 20s to 40s who do not date or marry.

Notes

References

External links
 The Lingering Effects of Japan’s “Employment Ice Age” Nippon.co
 Japan Times Editorial

See also
 Lost Decades
 Herbivore men
 ko|버블 세대|zh|泡沫世代ill|Bubble Generation
 1997 Asian Financial Crisis in South Korea

Economy of Japan
Demographics of Japan
Neologisms
Cultural generations
Japanese culture